Wandle Park is a public park in the London Borough of Merton near Colliers Wood Underground station in south London, England.

It is bounded to the south by Colliers Wood High Street, where there is an entrance, the River Wandle to the west (hence the name), and Byegrove Road to the north.

History
The land was purchased by Wimbledon Corporation for a public park and vested in the National Trust, and the park opened in 1907. In 1910 the Mill Pond Garden was added, purchased by public subscription.

Its footprint contains what was once the site of Wandlebank House and grounds. Recent re-design of the park was undertaken through Merton Groundwork Trust, completed by 2003.

See also
 Wandle Meadow Nature Park

References

External links
 Wandle Park website

Year of establishment missing
Parks and open spaces in the London Borough of Merton